John Willard Toland (June 29, 1912 – January 4, 2004) was an American writer and historian. He is best known for a biography of Adolf Hitler and a Pulitzer Prize-winning history of World War II-era Japan, The Rising Sun.

Biography

Toland was born in 1912 in La Crosse, Wisconsin. He graduated from Phillips Exeter Academy in New Hampshire in 1932 and from Williams College in 1936 and attended the Yale School of Drama for a time. His original goal was to become a playwright. In the summers between college years, he traveled with hobos and wrote several plays with hobos as central characters, none of which were performed. He recalled in 1961 that in his early years as a writer he had been "about as big a failure as a man can be". He claimed to have written six complete novels, 26 plays, and a hundred short stories before completing his first sale, a short story for which The American Magazine paid $165 in 1954. At one point he managed to get an article on dirigibles into LOOK magazine; it proved extremely popular and led to his career as a historian. Dirigibles were the subject of his first full-length published book, Ships in the Sky (1957).

His most important work may be The Rising Sun (Random House, 1970), for which he won the Pulitzer Prize for General Nonfiction in 1971. Based on original and extensive interviews with high-ranking Japanese officials who survived the war, the book chronicles the Empire of Japan from the military rebellion of February 1936 to the end of World War II. It won the Pulitzer because it was the first book in English to tell the history of the Pacific War from the Japanese point of view, rather than the prevailing American one.

Novels
While predominantly a writer of nonfiction, Toland also published two historical novels, Gods of War and Occupation. He says in his 1997 autobiography that he earned little money from his prize-winner The Rising Sun but was set for life from the earnings of Adolf Hitler, for which he also did original research.

Toland died of pneumonia on January 4, 2004, at Danbury Hospital in Danbury, Connecticut.

Books  
Non-Fiction

Ships in the Sky: The Story of the Great Dirigibles (New York: Henry Holt; London: F. Muller, 1957)
Battle: The Story of the Bulge, 1959, .
But Not in Shame: The Six Months After Pearl Harbor, 1962, 
The Dillinger Days, 1963, .
The Flying Tigers - Copyrighted 1963 First Printing From Laurel-Leaf Books 1979. Published by Dell Publishing 
The Last 100 Days: The Tumultuous and Controversial Story of the Final Days of World War II in Europe, 1966, reprint (2003) 
The Rising Sun: The Decline and Fall of the Japanese Empire, 1936-1945, 1970 HC , reprint .
The Great Dirigibles: Their Triumphs & Disasters, 1972, .
Adolf Hitler: The Definitive Biography, 1976, .
No Man's Land: 1918, The Last Year of the Great War, 1980, 
Infamy: Pearl Harbor And Its Aftermath, 1982, 
In Mortal Combat: Korea 1950-1953, 1991, 
Captured by History: One Man's Vision of Our Tumultuous Century, 1997, 

Novels
Gods of War, 1985, .
Occupation, 1987,

Articles 
'Death of a Dirigible', February 1959, American Heritage, Volume X Number 2, pp 18–23

See also

List of books by or about Adolf Hitler

References

External links
John Toland Papers at the National Archives Catalog
 

1912 births
2004 deaths
Deaths from pneumonia in Connecticut
Pulitzer Prize for General Non-Fiction winners
20th-century American non-fiction writers
Historians of Nazism
Historians of World War II
Writers from La Crosse, Wisconsin
Williams College alumni
20th-century American novelists
20th-century American historians
21st-century American historians
21st-century American male writers
American male novelists
Yale School of Drama alumni
Novelists from Wisconsin
American male non-fiction writers
20th-century American male writers
Historians from Wisconsin
People from Danbury, Connecticut